Craponne is a commune in the Metropolis of Lyon in the Auvergne-Rhône-Alpes region in eastern France.

History 
The name of the commune derives from crappe, which means quagmire in Old French.

From 1800 to 1960, Craponne was the capital of the launderers of Lyon. The museum of the Craponne Laundry (opened in 2004) traces the history of launderers, washerwomen and ironers, from washing in the river Yzeron to the modern industrial laundry.

The commune of Craponne was founded on 15 February 1836 when it separated from the mother-commune of Grézieu-la-Varenne. The first mayor, François Boirivent, was appointed on 8 May 1837 and a town hall and a school were opened. According to the first census in 1833, which was made especially to prepare for the separation, Craponne had only 874 inhabitants. On the first map established during this separation, the buildings are shown as sparse, with less than 150 houses or farms built on the 464 hectares of the town. Fifty years later, in 1886, the population of Craponne had doubled to nearly 1900 inhabitants. This increase was due to the boom in laundry, the proximity of the commune to Lyon, and  the opening in 1886 of the railway linking Lyon St-Just to Vaugneray which crossed Craponne.

Craponne was a member of the intercommunal structure surrounding the city of Lyon, known as Greater Lyon (Grand Lyon). This structure was replaced on 1 January 2015, and so Craponne is now part of the new territorial collectivity of the Lyon Metropolis.

Population

Places and monuments 
Two pillars from the Roman aqueduct of Yzeron, sometimes called the Craponne Aqueduct, remain standing and these are listed as an historical monument. The aqueduct was one of the four ancient aqueducts of Lyon, serving the ancient Roman city of Lugdunum. It owes its name to the fact that it draws water from the watershed of the Yzeron river, which is a tributary of the Rhône.

References

Communes of Lyon Metropolis
Lyonnais